Järna (also Dala-Järna to distinguish it from Järna in Södertälje Municipality) is a locality situated in Vansbro Municipality, Dalarna County, Sweden with 1,413 inhabitants in 2010.

The last traditional player of the Swedish bagpipes, Gudmunds Nils Larsson (died 1949) was from Järna.

Notable people
 

Mikael Strandberg (born 1962), explorer, filmmaker and writer

Sports
The following sports clubs are located in Dala Järna:

 Dala-Järna IK
 Dala-Järna Windsurfing Klubb

References 

Populated places in Dalarna County
Populated places in Vansbro Municipality